Springfield-Ritchot is a provincial electoral district in the Canadian province of Manitoba that came into effect at the 2019 Manitoba general election. It contains the R.M. of Ritchot, Niverville and the west of the R.M. of Springfield. In 2019, it elected Ron Schuler to the Legislative Assembly of Manitoba.

The riding was created by the 2018 provincial redistribution out of parts of St. Paul, La Verendrye, Dawson Trail and Morris.

Election results

2019 general election

References

Manitoba provincial electoral districts